A Taylor column is a fluid dynamics phenomenon that occurs as a result of the Coriolis effect. It was named after Geoffrey Ingram Taylor. Rotating fluids that are perturbed by a solid body tend to form columns parallel to the axis of rotation called Taylor columns.

An object moving parallel to the axis of rotation in a rotating fluid experiences more drag force than what it would experience in a non rotating fluid. For example, a strongly buoyant ball (such as a pingpong ball) will rise to the surface slower than it would in a non rotating fluid. This is because fluid in the path of the ball that is pushed out of the way tends to circulate back to the point it is shifted away from, due to the Coriolis effect. The faster the rotation rate, the smaller the radius of the inertial circle traveled by the fluid.

In a non-rotating fluid the fluid parts above the rising ball and closes in underneath it, offering relatively little resistance to the ball. In a rotating fluid, the ball needs to push up a whole column of fluid above it, and it needs to drag a whole column of fluid along beneath it in order to rise to the surface.

A rotating fluid thus displays some degree of rigidity.

History 
Taylor columns were first observed by William Thomson, Lord Kelvin, in 1868.  Taylor columns were featured in lecture demonstrations by Kelvin in 1881 and by John Perry in 1890.  The phenomenon is explained via the Taylor–Proudman theorem, and it has been investigated by Taylor, Grace, Stewartson, and Maxworthy—among others.

Theory 

Taylor columns have been rigorously studied. For Re<<1, Ek<<1, Ro<<1, the drag equation for a cylinder of radius, a, the following relation has been found.

To derive this, Moore and Saffman solved the linearised Navier–Stokes equation along in cylindrical coordinates, where some of the vertical and radial components of the viscous term are taken to be small relative to the Coriolis term:

To solve these equations, we incorporate the volume conservation condition as well:

We use the Ekman compatibility relation for this geometry to restrict the form of the velocity at the disk surface:

The resultant velocity fields can be solved in terms of Bessel functions.

whereby for Ek<<1 the function A(k) is given by,

Integrating the equation for the v, we can find the pressure and thus the drag force given by the first equation.

References

Further reading

External links 
Taylor columns (Martha Buckley, MIT)
Record Player Fluid Dynamics: A Taylor Column Experiment (UCLA Spin Lab)

Fluid mechanics
Physical oceanography